Vritz is a former commune in the Loire-Atlantique department in western France. On 1 January 2018, it was merged into the new commune of Vallons-de-l'Erdre.

See also 

 Communes of the Loire-Atlantique department

References 

Former communes of Loire-Atlantique
Populated places disestablished in 2018